Call Nick Ross was a ground-breaking phone-in on BBC Radio 4 between November 1986 and 1997.

Its significance was in the resources Radio 4 applied to what had, until then, been largely a cheap way of making radio shows, combined with the editorial skill of its presenter Nick Ross and editors including Nick Utechin. Replacing the superficially similar "Tuesday Call", the programme was heard each Tuesday between 9am and 10am, immediately following the Today programme, and so attracted an audience of politicians and journalists who were encouraged to phone in themselves. It was not uncommon for a listener to be able to talk directly to a government minister or someone else who was making news that day.

End 
The series won Nick Ross an award as broadcaster of the year, but was cancelled in 1997 soon after Ross left the show.

BBC Radio 4 programmes